Arima Yoshisada was a Japanese daimyo from Hizen. He lived during the Sengoku period. He was the son and successor of Arima Haruzumi and the father of Kirishitan daimyo Arima Harunobu. He was the 12th head of the Arima clan.

In 1563, Yoshisada formed a partnership with the Portuguese and the Jesuits due to the goods they brought to the domain. In 1576, Yoshisada converted to Christianity along with some of his subjects. He was given the bapstimal name Don Andre.

See also 
Arima Harunobu
Catholic Church in Japan
Arima clan

References 

1521 births
1577 deaths
Daimyo
Sengoku period
Arima clan